Jerome Anderson may refer to:

 Jerome Anderson (basketball) (1953–2009), American professional basketball player and coach
 Jerome Anderson (football agent), founder of Sports, Entertainment and Media Group (SEM)

See also
Jerry Anderson (disambiguation)